Charles Frank Lucas (25 November 1843 – 27 September 1919) was an English first-class cricketer and solicitor.

Lucas was born in November 1843 at Stowe-by-Chartley, Staffordshire. His association with cricket in Hampshire began in 1860 and he played for early Hampshire cricket teams. Lucas made his debut in first-class cricket in Hampshire County Cricket Club's inaugural first-class match against Sussex at Southampton in 1864. He scored his only first-class century the two years, making 135 runs against Surrey. Across all levels of cricket in 1866, he scored over 1,000 runs in the season. Lucas played first-class cricket for Hampshire until 1880, making fourteen appearances. In these he scored 502 runs at an average of 20.08. He also made three first-class appearances for the Gentlemen of the South against I Zingari in 1866, and the Players of the South in both 1866 and 1867. For the Gentlemen of the South, he scored 148 runs with a highest score of 48. As a fielder, he was considered one of the best long stops in England.

Outside of cricket, Lucas was a solicitor in Southampton. He died at Carshalton in September 1919. His cousin was the Test cricketer Bunny Lucas.

References

External links

1843 births
1919 deaths
Sportspeople from Staffordshire
English cricketers
Hampshire cricketers
Gentlemen of the South cricketers
English solicitors